Monopotassium phosphate (MKP) (also, potassium dihydrogenphosphate, KDP, or monobasic potassium phosphate) is the inorganic compound with the formula  KH2PO4.  Together with dipotassium phosphate (K2HPO4.(H2O)x) it is often used as a fertilizer, food additive, and buffering agent. The salt often cocrystallizes with the dipotassium salt as well as with phosphoric acid.

Single crystals are paraelectric at room temperature. At temperatures below , they become ferroelectric.

Structure
Monopotassium phosphate can exist in several polymorphs. At room temperature it forms paraelectric crystals with tetragonal symmetry. Upon cooling to  it transforms to a ferroelectric phase of orthorhombic symmetry, and the transition temperature shifts up to  when hydrogen is replaced by deuterium. Heating to  changes its structure to monoclinic.

Manufacturing
Monopotassium phosphate is produced by the action of phosphoric acid on potassium carbonate.

Applications
Fertilizer-grade MKP powder contains the equivalent of 52%  and 34% , and is labeled NPK0-52-34. MKP powder is often used as a nutrient source in the greenhouse trade and in hydroponics.

As a crystal, MKP is noted for its non-linear optical properties. Used in optical modulators and for non-linear optics such as second-harmonic generation (SHG).

Also to be noted is KD*P, potassium dideuterium phosphate, with slightly different properties. Highly deuterated KDP is used in nonlinear frequency conversion of laser light instead of protonated (regular) KDP due to the fact that the replacement of protons with deuterons in the crystal shifts the third overtone of the strong OH molecular stretch to longer wavelengths, moving it mostly out of the range of the fundamental line at approximately 1064 nm of neodymium-based lasers. Regular KDP has absorbances at this wavelength of approximately 4.7–6.3% per cm of thickness while highly deuterated KDP has absorbances of typically less than 0.8% per cm.

Monopotassium phosphate is used as an ingredient in sports drinks such as Gatorade and Powerade.

In medicine, monopotassium phosphate is used for phosphate substitution in hypophosphatemia.

Gallery

References

External links

International Chemical Safety Card 1608
EPA: Potassium dihydrogen phosphate Fact Sheet
Potassium Phosphatea Hydroculture Salt

Second-harmonic generation
Phosphates
Potassium compounds
Acid salts
Nonlinear optical materials
Transparent materials
E-number additives
Inorganic fertilizers